Japan Information Industry Association (JISA or 情報サービス産業協会 in Japanese) was established in 1984 as a merger of two organizations and is the largest non-profit organization of Japan's IT industry, related to the Japanese Ministry of Economy, Trade and Industry (METI).

History

Japan Information Industry Association (JISA) is the largest non-profit organization of Japan's IT industry, related to the Japanese Ministry of Economy, Trade and Industry (METI). It was established in 1984 as a merger of Japan Information Center Association and Software Industry Promotion Association.

JISA now has 650 regular members and 70 associate members, as of May, 2007.  The Chairperson is Tomokazu Hamaguchi, former CEO of NTT Data, elected in May 2007.

References
 JISA profile

For Japan, see:

 Computer Entertainment Suppliers' Association (CESA)
 Japan Telemarketing Association (JTA)
 JIPDEC (Japan Information Processing Development Corporation)
 Japan Data Center Council
 JEIDA (Japan Electronic Industries Development Association)

For similar organizations in Asia, see:

 China Software Industry Association (CSIA)
 Korea Software Industry Association (KSIA)
 Japan Information Industry Association (JISA)
 NASSCOM (National Association of Software and Services Companies), India
 Philippine Software Industry Association
 Vietnam Software Association (VINASA)

For U.S.A., see:

 SIIA (Software and Information Industry Association)
 Business Software Alliance 
 Association for Computing Machinery

External links
 JISA home page
 JISA - Junior Individual Savings Account (UK)

Economy of Japan
Non-profit organizations based in Japan
Information technology organizations based in Asia